Nicola Shearn (born 14 October 1966) is a former synchronized swimmer from Great Britain.

References 

1966 births
Living people
British synchronised swimmers
Olympic synchronised swimmers of Great Britain
Synchronized swimmers at the 1988 Summer Olympics
Synchronized swimmers at the 1986 World Aquatics Championships
Commonwealth Games medallists in synchronised swimming
Commonwealth Games silver medallists for England
Synchronised swimmers at the 1986 Commonwealth Games
People from Keynsham
Medallists at the 1986 Commonwealth Games